Altaquer is a settlement in Barbacoas Municipality, Nariño Department in Colombia.

Climate
Altaquer has a relatively cool due to elevation and very wet tropical rainforest climate (Af).

References

Nariño Department